24/7 is a Philippine action drama television series starring Julia Montes, Arjo Atayde, Melissa Ricks, Joem Bascon, Joross Gamboa, Denise Laurel and JC Santos. The series premiered on  ABS-CBN's Yes Weekend! Sunday block and worldwide via The Filipino Channel on February 23, 2020, replacing The Haunted.

Series overview

Episodes

Season 1
<onlyinclude>

References

Lists of Philippine drama television series episodes